Theodore Alvin Hall (October 20, 1925 – November 1, 1999) was an American physicist and an atomic spy for the Soviet Union, who, during his work on United States efforts to develop the first and second atomic bombs during World War II (the Manhattan Project), gave a detailed description of the "Fat Man" plutonium bomb, and of several processes for purifying plutonium, to Soviet intelligence. His brother, Edward N. Hall, was a rocket scientist who led the US Air Force's program to develop an intercontinental ballistic missile, personally designing the Minuteman missile and convincing the Pentagon and President Eisenhower to adopt it as a key part of the nation's strategic nuclear triad.

Early life
Theodore Alvin Holtzberg was born in Far Rockaway, New York City to a devout Jewish couple, Barnett Holtzberg and Rose Moskowitz. His father was a furrier who had emigrated to America to escape antisemitic pogroms in the Russian Empire. His mother was a second-generation Russian Jew who died while Theodore was a teenager and a student at Harvard University. The Great Depression hurt Barnett's business significantly; when it was no longer able to support the household, the family moved to Washington Heights in Upper Manhattan.

Even at a young age, Theodore showed an impressive aptitude for mathematics and science, mostly being tutored by his elder brother Edward, who was 11 years his senior. After skipping three grades at Public School 173 in Washington Heights, in the fall of 1937, Hall entered the Townsend Harris High School for gifted boys. After graduation from high school, he was accepted into Queens College at the age of 14 in 1940, and transferred to Harvard University in 1942 as junior physics major, where he graduated at the age of 18 in 1944.

In the fall of 1936, despite the protests of their parents, Edward, his brother, legally changed both his and Theodore's last name to Hall in an effort to avoid anti-semitic hiring practices he was experiencing that were prevalent at the time.

Manhattan Project

At the age of 18, on the recommendation of Prof. John Van Vleck, Hall was hired as the youngest physicist to be recruited to work on the Manhattan Project at Los Alamos. At Los Alamos, after first helping to determine the critical mass of uranium used for "Little Boy"., Hall was assigned to conduct experiments on and tests of the almost baroquely complex implosion system ("Fat Man"). He was eventually, while still a teen, put in charge of a team working on that difficult task.

Hall later claimed that as it became clear in the summer of 1944 that Germany was losing the war and would not ever manage to develop an atomic bomb, he became concerned about the consequences of an American monopoly on atomic weapons once the war ended. He was especially worried about the possibility of the emergence of a fascist government in the United States, should it have such a nuclear monopoly and want to keep it that way. He was not alone. It was widely known inside the confines of Los Alamos, that Gen. Leslie Groves, director of the entire far-flung Manhattan Project, had revealed to a group of top physicists there at a dinner that the real target of the US atom bomb was the Soviet Union, a shocking statement that led one top physicist, Josef Rotblat, to resign from the Project, and others like Niels Bohr and Leo Szilard to vainly petition first Roosevelt, and later Truman to halt it, not use it on people in Japan, or to inform the Soviets about it.

On the pretext of returning to his home in New York City for his 19th birthday in October 1944, Ted Hall visited the headquarters of Amtorg, the Soviet Union trading company located in a loft building on 24th Street in Midtown Manhattan. There an American worker for Amtorg gave him the name and address of Sergey Kurnakov, a military writer for Soviet Russia Today and Russky Golos—the same contact that was also recommended to his Harvard friend, roommate and eventually initial spy courier Saville Sax, by the head of a Soviet Cultural center in New York, Artkino. Unaware initially that Kurnakov was an NKVD agent, Hall handed him a report on the scientists who worked at Los Alamos, the conditions at Los Alamos, and the basic science behind the bomb. Saville Sax subsequently delivered the same report to the Soviet Consulate, which he visited under the guise of inquiring about relatives still in the Soviet Union. The two eventually met with Anatoly Yatskov, the New York station chief operating under the cover of being a Consular clerk, who two weeks later transmitted the information about both young men to NKVD headquarters in Moscow using a one-time pad cipher. After officially becoming an informant for the Soviet Union, Hall was given the code-name MLAD, a Slavic root meaning "young", and Sax, who was almost a year older than Hall, was given the code-name STAR, a Slavic root meaning "old".

Kurnakov reported in November 1944:

Unbeknownst to Hall, Klaus Fuchs, a Los Alamos colleague, and others still unidentified, were also spying for the USSR; none seems to have known of the others.  Harvard friend Saville Sax acted as Hall's courier until spring of 1945 when, because he was returning to full-time student status at Harvard, he was replaced by Lona Cohen. Igor Kurchatov, a scientist and the head of the Soviet atomic bomb effort, probably used information provided by Klaus Fuchs to confirm corresponding information provided earlier by Hall. Despite other scientists giving information to the Soviet Union, Hall was the only known scientist to give details on the design of an atomic bomb until recent revelations of the role of Oscar Seborer.

Career after Los Alamos
In June 1946, Hall's security clearance was revoked by the US Army, not over suspicions of his being a Soviet asset but because of discovery of a letter from Britain he had received from his British sister-in-law, brother Edward's wife Edith, who inquired jokingly of him: "I hear you're working on something that goes up with a big bang! Can you send us one of them for Guy Fawkes Day?" as well as left-wing publications he'd been receiving in the mail at Los Alamos over the prior year that overworked censors had apparently overlooked at the time. Furloughed out of the military with an honorable discharge and a citation from Pres. Truman for the achievements of the Army's Special Engineering Detachment at Los Alamos of which he had been a part, Ted headed that fall for the University of Chicago, where he finished out his master's and doctoral degrees in physics, met his wife, and started a family. After graduating he became a biophysicist. 

In Chicago, as a graduate student research assistant, he pioneered important techniques in X-ray microanalysis. In 1952, he left the University of Chicago's Institute for Radiobiology and Biophysics to take a research position in biophysics at Memorial Sloan-Kettering in New York City. In 1962, he became unsatisfied with his equipment and the techniques available to him. He then moved to Vernon Ellis Cosslett's electron microscopy research laboratory at Cambridge University in England. At Cambridge he created the Hall Method of continuum normalization, developed for the specific purpose of analyzing thin sections of biological tissue. He remained working at Cambridge until he retired at the age of 59 in 1984.

Hall later became active in obtaining signatures for the Stockholm Peace Pledge.

Death

On November 1, 1999, Theodore Hall died at the age of 74, in Cambridge, England. Although he had suffered from Parkinson's disease, he ultimately succumbed to renal cancer, likely acquired as a result of the experimental work he was doing with plutonium in his year working on the "Gadget" used for the Trinity test. .

FBI investigation
The US Army's Signal Intelligence Service Venona project (precursor to the National Security Agency (NSA), decrypted some Soviet messages and in January 1950 uncovered one cable identifying Hall and Sax by name as Soviet spies (albeit misspelled as Teodor Kholl and Savil Sachs), but until the document's public release along with many other pages of Soviet wartime spy cables in July 1995, nearly all of the espionage regarding the Los Alamos nuclear weapons program was attributed to Klaus Fuchs. Hall was questioned by the Federal Bureau of Investigation in March 1951 but was not charged.  The FBI and Justice department claimed this was because their only evidence was the Venona document and that the US did not want to let the Soviets know they had broken their elaborate and supposedly "unbreakable" code. Alan H. Belmont, the number-three man in the FBI, claims he decided at that time that information coming out of the Venona project would be inadmissible in court as hearsay evidence and so its value in the case was not worth compromising the program. 

However, journalist Dave Lindorff, writing in The Nation magazine on January 4, 2022, obtained on appeal in 2021 through the Freedom of information Act, the FBI file for Edward Nathaniel Hall. This 130-page file included communications between FBI Director J. Edgar Hoover to the head of the Air Force Office of Special Investigations, Gen. Joseph F. Carroll, showing that Carroll had effectively blocked Hoover's intended pursuit of Ted Hall and Saville Sax, fearing that Hall's arrest would have, in the political climate of the McCarthy Era, forced the Air Force to furlough and lose their top missile expert, USAF Maj. Edward Hall. Carroll, a former top aide to Hoover before he became the first head of the USAF OSI, ultimately allowed Hoover's agents to question Ed Hall on June 12, 1951 (with an OSI officer monitoring the interview), but restricting the questioning to matters involving Edward himself, not his brother Ted. Within several weeks of that session, the Air Force, which had conducted and completed its own investigation into Edward Hall's loyalty (having their own investigators question him four times), promoted him to Lt. Colonel, and later Colonel, and elevated him from assistant director to director of its missile development program. The promotions were a clear slap to FBI Director Hoover. Col. Ed Hall went on to complete the development of the Minuteman missile program, and then, retiring from the Air Force, but at the urging of the Pentagon, went on as a civilian to lead the development of France's own independent IRBM nuclear missile, the Diamant. In 1999 the Air Force honored him seven years before his death, by adding him to the Air Force Aerospace Hall of Fame.

Lindorff co-produced the 2022 documentary film A Compassionate Spy based on Hall's life and spying.

Statements in 1990s

The Venona project became public knowledge in July 1995. (www.nsa.gov/Helpful-Links/NSA-FOIA/Declassification-Transparency-Initiatives/Historical-Releases/Venona/smdpage14707/14/te=)

In a written statement published in 1997, Hall came very close to admitting that the Soviet spy cable identifying him as a Soviet asset was accurate, although obliquely, saying that in the immediate postwar years, he felt strongly that "an American monopoly" on nuclear weapons "was dangerous and should be avoided:"

A year before his death, he gave a more direct confession in an interview for the TV-series Cold War on CNN in 1998, saying:

List of publications

See also

 Klaus Fuchs
 Oscar Seborer
 Saville Sax
 Lona Cohen
 Morris Cohen (spy)
 Manhattan Project
 Los Alamos
 J. Robert Oppenheimer
 Oppenheimer security hearing
 Atomic spies
 Soviet espionage in the United States
 Nuclear espionage

References

Further reading
 Dave Lindorff, "Brothers against the Bureau: Ted Hall, the Soviet Union's youngest atomic spy, his rocket scientist brother Ed, and the untold story of how J. Edgar Hoover's biggest Manhattan Project bust was shut down", The Nation, vol. 314, no. 1 (January 10–17, 2022), pp. 26–31.

External links
 "The Boy Who Gave Away The Bomb", The New York Times Magazine (September 14, 1997)
 FBI: Memo Prosecution: Disadvantages (February 1, 1956)
  (by Joan Hall, wife)
 Los Alamos National Laboratory: History: Spies
 Alsos Digital Library for Nuclear Issues: Annotated bibliography for Theodore Hall
 "Secrets, Lies, and Atomic Spies", PBS Transcript, Airdate: February 5, 2002

1925 births
1999 deaths
20th-century American physicists
20th-century American Jews
Jewish American physicists
Manhattan Project people
World War II spies for the Soviet Union
American spies for the Soviet Union
American people in the Venona papers
Nuclear weapons program of the Soviet Union
People from Far Rockaway, Queens
Harvard University alumni
University of Chicago alumni
People from Washington Heights, Manhattan
Townsend Harris High School alumni
Queens College, City University of New York alumni
People with Parkinson's disease
Deaths from kidney cancer
Deaths from cancer in England